Glamorgan County may refer to:

 the historic county of Glamorgan, Wales
 Glamorgan County RFC
 the former name of Glamorgan Land District, Tasmania, Australia